On How Life Is is the debut studio album by American singer and songwriter Macy Gray. It was released on July 1, 1999, by Epic Records and Clean Slate. Produced by Andrew Slater, it became Gray's best-selling album to date, selling 3.4 million copies in the United States and seven million copies worldwide.

The album's second single, "I Try", became an international success, topping the charts in Australia, Ireland, and New Zealand, while reaching number five on the US Billboard Hot 100. The song also won a Grammy Award for Best Female Pop Vocal Performance in 2001.

Critical reception

On How Life Is was met with highly positive reviews from music critics upon its release, with many praising Gray's songwriting and vocal performance. Q rated the album four out of five stars, calling it a "confident, bluesy soul debut [...] with a lived-in sound – as if Rod Stewart were a girl."

Track listing

Sample credits
 "Do Something" contains a sample of "Git Up, Git Out" by OutKast and "Funky for You" by Nice & Smooth.
 "I've Committed Murder" contains a sample of "Live Right Now" by Eddie Harris and an interpolation of "(Where Do I Begin?) Love Story" by Francis Lai & His Orchestra.
 "A Moment to Myself" contains a sample of "Human Beat Box" by The Fat Boys, excerpts of "The Wildstyle" by Time Zone, and a sample of "Entropy (Hip Hop Reconstruction from the Ground Up)" by DJ Shadow & the Groove Robbers.

Personnel
Credits adapted from the liner notes of On How Life Is.

Musicians

 Macy Gray – lead vocals, vocal arrangements ; backing vocals 
 Dawn Beckman – backing vocals 
 Musiic Galloway – backing vocals 
 Jeremy Ruzumna – backing vocals ; organ ; piano ; electric piano, Moog ; Farfisa, clavinet ; Rhodes ; Optigan, Chamberlin 
 David Wilder – backing vocals ; bass 
 Jinsoo Lim – guitar 
 Arik Marshall – guitar 
 Lenny Castro – percussion 
 Matt Chamberlain – percussion ; drums 
 Darryl Swann – backing vocals, guitar ; programming ; vocal arrangements 
 DJ Kiilu – turntables ; programming 
 Jon Brion – Chamberlin ; synths ; guitar ; piano ; orchestra bells ; vibes ; marimba ; Optigan 
 Patrick Warren – vibes ; Chamberlin ; synths ; Rhodes, Wurlitzer 
 Dion Derek Murdock – bass 
 Sy Smith – backing vocals 
 Bendrix Williams – guitar 
 Rami Jaffee – synths ; piano, Optigan, Chamberlin 
 Blackbyrd McKnight – guitar 
 Gabriel Moses – guitar 
 Steve Baxter – horn 
 Charlie Green – horn 
 Michael Harris – horn 
 Miles Tackett – guitar 
 Greg Richling – bass 
 David Campbell – string arrangement 
 Jay Joyce – guitar 
 Ngozi Inyama – sax solo

Technical

 Andrew Slater – production
 Dave Way – recording, mixing
 Darryl "D-Style" Swann – additional engineering
 Howard Willing – first assistant engineer
 Dave Reed – second assistant engineer
 Kevin Dean – second assistant engineer
 Jeff Walch – second assistant engineer
 Michelle Forbes – second assistant engineer
 Sherry Sutcliff – production coordination

Artwork
 Stéphane Sednaoui – photography
 Hooshik – art direction, design
 Frank Harkins – art direction

Charts

Weekly charts

Year-end charts

Decade-end charts

Certifications and sales

Release history

References

1999 debut albums
Albums recorded at A&M Studios
Albums recorded at Sunset Sound Recorders
Epic Records albums
Macy Gray albums